The 2013–14 Essex Senior Football League season was the 43rd in the history of Essex Senior Football League a football competition in England.

League table

The league featured 17 clubs which competed in the league last season, along with three new clubs:
FC Romania, promoted from the Middlesex County League
Ilford, relegated from the Isthmian League
Haringey Borough, transferred from the Spartan South Midlands League

Also, Haringey & Waltham Development changed name to Greenhouse London, while Bethnal Green United changed name to Tower Hamlets.

League table

Results

References

External links
 FA Full-Time League Websites (Essex Senior Football League 2012-13)

Essex Senior Football League seasons
9